West Barnstable station is a railway station in West Barnstable, Massachusetts. The train station currently serves as a weekend stop for several excursion trains operated by the Cape Cod Central Railroad. The station building, which is owned by the Town of Barnstable, Massachusetts, is the headquarters on the Cape Cod Chapter of the National Railway Historical Society (NRHS).

History

The original passenger station in West Barnstable was opened in 1854 by the Cape Cod Railroad.

This station was torn down and a new station was built, at the same location, by the New Haven Railroad in 1911 at a cost of $18,000.  The original architecture style of the station was identical to the stations that the New Haven Railroad built in Buzzards Bay and Sagamore around the same time.

The station served trains to Boston and seasonal trains to New York City and remained in service until 1964 when the New Haven Railroad ran its last passenger trains to Cape Cod including the Day Cape Codder. Between 1986 and 1996 it was an unmanned station stop for Amtrak's Cape Codder service. It is one station that has been eliminated from the schedule of the seasonal Cape Flyer train service between Boston and Hyannis. From the 19th Century, under the Old Colony Railroad and until 1964 under the New York, New Haven and Hartford Railroad, passenger trains served Sandwich. Trains of the 1940s-1960s included the Day Cape Codder and the Neptune.

The property once included a detached freight house but it was torn down a few decades ago. The station was used as a shooting location for the films The Golden Boys (2008) and The Lightkeepers (2009). The Cape Cod Chapter of the NRHS signed a twenty-year lease on the building in 2012.  They have been restoring it as a historical railway station and museum since 2001 when they became the custodian of the building. The station building, which is open to the public on Saturdays between May and October, also hosts numerous special events, including National Train Day in May, the West Barnstable village festival in August and the Cranberry Express in October.

During the summer, West Barnstable serves as a stop for select excursion trains running from Hyannis to the Cape Cod Canal, often including an additional stop at the historic Pairpoint Glass facility in Sagamore. Although trains depart from Hyannis every day of the week during the summer, West Barnstable is only served on Saturdays.

References

External links

Cape Cod Chapter, National Railway Historical Society
Google Maps Street View image of the station
Cape Cod Model Railroad Club - located next to the West Barnstable station

Barnstable, Massachusetts
Cape Cod Central Railroad stations
Old Colony Railroad Stations on Cape Cod
Stations along Old Colony Railroad lines
Former Amtrak stations in Massachusetts
Buildings and structures in Barnstable, Massachusetts
Tourist attractions in Barnstable County, Massachusetts
Museums in Barnstable County, Massachusetts
Railroad museums in Massachusetts
1911 establishments in Massachusetts